Mae Louise Suggs (September 7, 1923 – August 7, 2015) was an  American professional golfer, one of the founders of the LPGA Tour and thus modern ladies' golf.

Amateur career
Born in Atlanta, Suggs had a very successful amateur career, beginning as a teenager. She won the Georgia State Amateur in 1940 at age 16 and again in 1942, was the Southern Amateur Champion in 1941 and 1947, and won the North and South Women's Amateur three times (1942, 1946, 1948). She won the 1946 and 1947 Women's Western Amateur and the 1946 and 1947 Women's Western Open, which was designated as a major championship when the LPGA was founded. She also won the 1946 Titleholders Championship which was also subsequently designated as a women's major. She won the 1947 U.S. Women's Amateur and the next year won the British Ladies Amateur. She finished her amateur career representing the United States on the 1948 Curtis Cup Team.

Professional career
After her successful amateur career, she turned professional in 1948 and went on to win 58 additional professional tournaments, with a total of 11 majors. Her prowess on the golf course is reflected in the fact that from 1950 to 1960 she was only once out of the top 3 in the season-ending money list. Suggs' victory in the 1957 LPGA Championship made her the first LPGA player to complete a career Grand Slam.

Suggs was an inaugural inductee into the LPGA Tour Hall of Fame, established in 1967, and was inducted into the World Golf Hall of Fame in 1979.  She was inducted into the Georgia Sports Hall of Fame in 1966.

She was one of the co-founders of the LPGA in 1950, which included her two great rivals of the time, Patty Berg and Babe Zaharias. Suggs served as the organization's president from 1955 to 1957.

Honors
The Louise Suggs Rolex Rookie of the Year Award, given annually to the most accomplished first-year player on the LPGA Tour, is named in her honor.  In 2006 Suggs was named the 2007 recipient of the Bob Jones Award, given by the United States Golf Association in recognition of distinguished sportsmanship in golf. In February 2015 she became one of the first female members of the Royal and Ancient Golf Club of St Andrews.

Amateur wins
1940 Georgia Women's Amateur, Southern Women's Amateur
1942 Georgia Women's Amateur, North and South Women's Amateur
1946 North and South Women's Amateur, Women's Western Amateur
1947 Southern Women's Amateur, Women's Western Amateur, U.S. Women's Amateur
1948 North and South Women's Amateur, British Ladies Amateur

Professional wins

LPGA Tour wins (61)
1946 (3) Titleholders Championship, Women's Western Open (as an amateur), Pro-Lady Victory National Championship (as an amateur, with Ben Hogan)
1947 (1) Women's Western Open (as an amateur)
1948 (1) Belleair Open
1949 (4) U.S. Women's Open, Women's Western Open, All American Open, Muskegon Invitational
1950 (2) Chicago Weathervane, New York Weathervane
1951 (1) Carrollton Georgia Open
1952 (6) Jacksonville Open, Tampa Open, Stockton Open, U.S. Women's Open, All American Open, Betty Jameson Open
1953 (9) Tampa Open, Betsy Rawls Open, Phoenix Weathervane (tied with Patty Berg), San Diego Open, Bakersfield Open, San Francisco Weathervane, Philadelphia Weathervane, 144 Hole Weathervane, Women's Western Open
1954 (5) Sea Island Open, Titleholders Championship, Betsy Rawls Open, Carrollton Georgia Open, Babe Zaharias Open
1955 (5) Los Angeles Open, Oklahoma City Open, Eastern Open, Triangle Round Robin, St. Louis Open
1956 (3) Havana Open, Titleholders Championship, All American Open
1957 (2) LPGA Championship, Heart of America Invitational
1958 (4) Babe Zaharias Open, Gatlinburg Open, Triangle Round Robin, French Lick Open
1959 (3) St. Petersburg Open, Titleholders Championship, Dallas Civitan Open
1960 (4) Dallas Civitan Open, Triangle Round Robin, Youngstown Kitchens Trumbull Open, San Antonio Civitan
1961 (7) Naples Pro-Am, Royal Poinciana Invitational, Golden Circle of Golf Festival, Dallas Civitan Open, Kansas City Open, San Antonio Civitan, Sea Island Open 
1962 (1) St. Petersburg Open

LPGA majors are shown in bold.

Major championships

Wins (11)

(a)=Amateur

Team appearances
Amateur
Curtis Cup (representing the United States): 1948 (winners)

See also
Women’s Career Grand Slam Champion
List of golfers with most LPGA Tour wins
List of golfers with most LPGA major championship wins

References

External links

American female golfers
LPGA Tour golfers
Winners of ladies' major amateur golf championships
Winners of LPGA major golf championships
World Golf Hall of Fame inductees
Golfers from Atlanta
Golfers from Florida
Sportspeople from Delray Beach, Florida
1923 births
2015 deaths
21st-century American women